Gloria Amarilis Lohaiza Barillas (born 22 April 1987), known as Amarilis Lohaiza, is a Guatemalan retired footballer who played as a midfielder. She has been a member of the Guatemala women's national team.

International career
Lohaiza capped for Guatemala at senior level during the 2010 CONCACAF Women's World Cup Qualifying qualification, the 2010 Central American and Caribbean Games and the 2012 CONCACAF Women's Olympic Qualifying Tournament (and its qualification).

References

1987 births
Living people
Guatemalan women's footballers
Guatemala women's international footballers
Women's association football midfielders
Guatemalan women's futsal players